Chinese Opium Den (also known as Opium Joint) is an 1894 American short black-and-white silent film. It is an early motion picture produced by Thomas Edison.

Very little is known about this film as no print is believed to exist and all that remains is a single still image. It is believed to be the first motion picture to explore the issue of drug usage. Ten years later Edison produced Rube in an Opium Joint, which is seen as the earliest such film that still survives.

According to the Internet Movie Database the film was made in a 35mm film format with an aspect ratio of 1.33:1. The film was intended to be displayed through means of a Kinetoscope.

References

External links 
 
https://www.listal.com/movie/chinese-opium-den

1894 films
1890s American films
American black-and-white films
American silent short films
Lost American films
Thomas Edison
Films about opium
1890s lost films
1894 short films